The Ansoff matrix is a strategic planning tool that provides a framework to help executives, senior managers, and marketers devise strategies for future business growth. It is named after Russian American Igor Ansoff, an applied mathematician and business manager, who created the concept.

Growth strategies 
Ansoff, in his 1957 paper, Strategies for Diversification, provided a definition for product-market strategy as "a joint statement of a product line and the corresponding set of missions which the products are designed to fulfill". He describes four growth alternatives for growing an organization in existing or new markets, with existing or new products. Each alternative poses differing levels of risk for an organization.

Market penetration
Using a market penetration strategy, the organization tries to grow using its existing offerings (products and services) in existing markets. In other words, it tries to increase its market share in current market scenario. This involves increasing market share within existing market segments. This can be achieved by selling more products or services to established customers or by finding new customers within existing markets. Here, the company seeks increased sales for its present products in its present markets through more aggressive promotion and distribution.

This can be accomplished by:
 Price decrease
 Increase in promotion and distribution support
 Acquisition of a rival in the same market
 Modest product refinements

This is the least risky growth option.

Market development
In a market development strategy, a firm tries to expand into new markets (geographies, countries etc.) using its existing offerings and also, with minimal product/services development.

This can be accomplished by:
 Different customer segments
 Industrial buyers for a good that was previously sold only to the households
 New areas or regions of the country
 Foreign markets

This strategy is more likely to be successful where:
 The firm has a unique product technology it can leverage in the new market
 It benefits from economies of scale if it increases output
 The new market is not too different from the one in which it has experience 
 The buyers in the market are intrinsically profitable

This additional quadrant move increases uncertainty and thus increases the risk further.

Product development
In a product development strategy, a company tries to create new products and services targeted at its existing markets to achieve growth.
This involves extending the product range available to the firm's existing markets. These products may be obtained by:
 Investment in research and development of additional products;
 Acquisition of rights to produce someone else's product;
 Buying in the product and "badging" it as one's own brand;
 Joint development with ownership of another company who need access to the firm's distribution channels or brands.

This also consists of one quadrant move so is riskier than market penetration and a similar risk as market development.

Diversification
In diversification an organization tries to grow its market share by introducing new offerings in new markets. It is the most risky strategy because both product and market development is required.

Related diversification: there is a relationship and, therefore, potential synergy, between the firms in existing business and the new product/market
space.

Unrelated diversification, otherwise termed "conglomerate growth" because the resulting corporation is a conglomerate, i.e. a collection of businesses without any relationship to one another. A strategy for company growth by starting up or acquiring businesses outside the company's current products and markets.

Diversification consists of two quadrant moves so is deemed the riskiest growth option.

Uses 
The Ansoff matrix is a useful tool for organizations wanting to identify and explore their growth options. Although the risk varies between quadrants, with diversification being the riskiest, it can be argued that if an organization diversifies its offering successfully into multiple unrelated markets then, in fact, its overall portfolio risk is lowered.

An approach to personal career development has also been developed using the matrix, with expert development (same industry, same skills) corresponding to market penetration, industry transfer to market development, functional skill development matching to product development and retraining matching to diversification.

Criticisms

Isolation challenges 
Used by itself, the Ansoff matrix could be misleading. It does not take into account the activities of competitors and the ability for competitors to counter moves into other industries. It also fails to consider the challenges and risks of changes to business-as-usual activities. An organization hoping to move into new markets or create new products (or both) must consider whether they possess transferable skills, flexible structures, and agreeable stakeholders.

Logical consistency challenges 
The logic of the Ansoff matrix has been questioned. The logical issues pertain to interpretations about newness. If one assumes a new product really is new to the firm, in many cases a new product will simultaneously take the firm into a new, unfamiliar market. In that case, one of the Ansoff quadrants, diversification, is redundant. Alternatively, if a new product does not necessarily take the firm into a new market, then the combination of new products into new markets does not always equate to diversification, in the sense of venturing into a completely unknown business.

See also
 Business model
 Business triage 
 First-mover advantage
 Marketing
 Market segmentation

References

Business terms